XHJK may refer to:

 XHJK-FM, a radio station (102.1 FM) in Ciudad Delicias, Chihuahua, Mexico
 XHJK-TDT, a television station (channel 28, virtual 1) in Tijuana, Baja California, Mexico